This is a list of launches performed or scheduled to be performed by Ariane launch vehicles between 2020 and 2029. During this time, the Ariane 5 will be retired in favour of the Ariane 6 rocket.

Launch statistics

Rocket configurations

Launch outcomes

Launch history 
Source: Arianespace Press Kits

2020

2021

2022

Future launches

References